Marian Dimitrov (born 11 June 1972 in Kardzhali) is a Bulgarian sprint canoer who competed in the early 2000s. At the 2000 Summer Olympics in Sydney, he was eliminated in the heats of the K-2 1000 m event.

References
 Sports-Reference.com profile

1972 births
Bulgarian male canoeists
Canoeists at the 2000 Summer Olympics
Living people
Olympic canoeists of Bulgaria